A Miniature sheet is a small group of stamps that are still attached to the sheet on which they are printed. They could be regular issues or commemorative ones as well. They could be individual designs as well with special illustrations on the sheet. Several miniature sheets have been issued by India which portrays different aspects of the nation's identity like famous personalities, important events, art and culture, history, monuments etc.

India Post issued its first miniature sheet on 14 November 1973.

List of miniature sheets

References

Sources
 
 
 http://indianpostagestamps.com
 
 

Postage stamps of India
India communications-related lists
Indian culture-related lists